This is an (incomplete) list of moths of the family of Thyrididae that are found in India. It also acts as an index to the species articles and forms part of the full List of moths of India.

 Addaea trimeronalis Walker, 1859
 Aglaopus glareola Felder, Felder & Rogenhofer, 1875
 Banisia myrsusalis (Walker, 1895)
 Banisia myrtaea (Drury, 1773)
 Calindoea trifascialis Moore
 Collinsa acutalis (Walker, 1866)
 Dysodia ignita (Walker, 1858)
 Dysodia viridatrix (Walker, 1858)
 Glanycus coendersi Kalis
 Herdonia osacesalis Walker, 1859
 Hapana carcealis Whalley, 1971
 Hypolamprus emblicalis Moore, 1888
 Hypolamprus trifascialis Moore
 Mathoris loceusalis (Walker 1859)
 Mathoris thyralis (Walker 1866)
 Microbelia intimalis Moore, 1888
 Microctenucha munda (Hampson 1893)
 Picrostomastis subrosealis (Leech, 1889)
 Rhodoneura bracteata Hampson
 Rhodoneura recticulatis Moore
 Rhodoneura spendida Butler
 Rhodoneura uniformis Hampson
 Striglina lineola Guenée, 1877
 Striglina scitaria (Walker, 1863)
 Striglina strigosa (Moore, 1882)

See also
List of moths of India

References
Rao, Kailash Chandra & Kamla Devi, 2013. Endemic Fauna of Andaman and Nicobar islands. Oological Survey of India. 182 pp.

 
x
M